Roberto Ivano Luca Vacchi (born November 28, 1965 in Stockholm) is an Italian-Swedish retired racing cyclist and a sports commentator on Eurosport. He commentates cross-country skiing and a variety of other sports, but is most known for his cycling coverage together with Anders Adamson. Vacchi also works as an announcer at the Swedish national football team's home matches, Vasaloppet, Royal Palace Sprint and other events.

Biography
Roberto Vacchi was born in Stockholm in 1965, to his two Italian parents who emigrated to Sweden in the 1950s. At the age of 9, his family moved back to Italy to La Spezia where he discovered competitive cycling. After a few years in Italy they moved back to Sweden. There he continued his career in cycling with Hammarby IF (1978–79), Spårvägens GoIF (1980–1991) and in 1992 Västerås CK, where he ended his career, tired of the bad economic situation that came with competitive cycling at elite level.

In 1993, whilst working for the Swedish Cycling Association, Eurosport approached Vacchi with an offer to commentate cycling on TV. In the beginning he did not comment much, but eventually it became a full-time job. He has credited Bengt Grive as his mentor during the first years at Eurosport.

Vacchi is known for his enthusiastic commentary on cycling races and for his vast knowledge of the sport as well as being able to give detailed geographical, cultural and historical information on places around the tours. Together with his colleague Anders Adamson, Vacchi is often considered one of Sweden's best sport commentators. His favourite cyclist is Italian Fausto Coppi.

Vacchi also works as the press director for the Swedish Ski Association and as the editor-in-chief of the cross-country skiing magazine Glid.

References 

1965 births
Sports commentators
Swedish male cyclists
Italian male cyclists
Cycling announcers
Living people
Swedish people of Italian descent
Sportspeople from Stockholm